Muckle Roe is an island in Shetland, Scotland, in St. Magnus Bay, to the west of Mainland. It has a population of around 130 people, who mainly croft and live in the south east of the island.

'Muckle' is Scots for 'big' or 'great'.

History 
The island is referred to in the Orkneyinga saga.

In 1905 a bridge was built between Muckle Roe and the Shetland Mainland over Roe Sound at a cost of £1,020 met from public subscription and a grant from the Congested Districts Board. The construction was of iron and concrete and its completion was followed by a reversal in the population decline seen in the 19th and earlier 20th centuries. The bridge was later widened and strengthened, and opened on 22 October 1947 by the Convener of Zetland, W. Thomson Esq. Construction of a replacement bridge commenced in May 1998, the work being completed in January 1999. It was opened officially by Councillor Drew Ratter on 3 April 1999.

Muckle Roe was part of the civil parish of Delting until the abolition of civil parishes in Scotland by the Local Government (Scotland) Act 1929.

Geography and geology 
Its highest point is Mid Ward .

The island's rock is red granite, which gives the island its name – a combination of Scots and Old Norse meaning "big red island".

There are crofts in the east and south east. The rest of the island is lochan-studded moorland.

Population

Notable residents
Gilbert Williamson Wood (2 September 1828 – 24 September 1886), a merchant seaman, was born at Little Ayre and emigrated to Adelaide, Australia in 1853. He founded G. Wood, Son & Co. along with his eldest son Peter in 1876. The company produced goods under a number of brand names, including Anchor, Snowflake, Viking, and Medallion. He donated sums of money back to Muckle Roe, including funds towards the building of the first bridge to mainland Shetland, and the Muckle Roe Church of Scotland, which was completed in 1911. The remaining funds were used to purchase books and school bags for every child attending the local school. Some profits from the sale of Anchor butter went towards paraffin lamps for the chapel.

Gallery

See also 

 List of lighthouses in Scotland
 List of Northern Lighthouse Board lighthouses

Notes

References 
 
 Keay, J. & Keay, J. (1994) Collins Encyclopaedia of Scotland. London. HarperCollins.
 Nicolson, James R. (1972) Shetland. Newton Abbott. David & Charles.
 Waugh, Doreen "Placing Papa Stour in Context" in Ballin Smith, Beverley; Taylor, Simon; and Williams, Gareth (2007) West over Sea: Studies in Scandinavian Sea-Borne Expansion and Settlement Before 1300. Leiden. Brill.

External links 

 scottishislands.org.uk
 Shetland in Statistics 2006 from shetland.gov.uk
 Northern Lighthouse Board

Islands of Shetland